Lee T. Bashore (June 7, 1898 - September 14, 1944) was a United States Republican politician, who served in the California State Assembly for the 49th district from 1939 to 1944.

Bashore served in the United States Army during World War I.  He was elected in 1934 and died shortly before the 1944 election, too late for his name to be removed from the ballot paper.

References

United States Army personnel of World War I
1944 deaths
1898 births
20th-century American politicians
Republican Party members of the California State Assembly